The following is a list of people from Harvey County, Kansas.  Inclusion on the list should be reserved for notable people past and present who have resided in the county, either in cities or rural areas.

Academics
 Errett Bishop, mathematician
 John Keeny, president of Louisiana Tech University from 1908 to 1926

Athletics
See also List of Bethel Threshers head football coaches
 Monty Beisel, professional football player
 Tony Clark, professional baseball player
 Andy Dirks, professional baseball player for the Detroit Tigers; competed in the 2012 World Series
 Harold E. Foster, member of the Naismith Memorial Basketball Hall of Fame
 Brian Moorman, professional football player for the Buffalo Bills
 Dustin Richardson, professional baseball player
 Jim Roper, NASCAR driver
 Adolph Rupp, one of the most successful college basketball coaches in the history of American college basketball and member of the Naismith Memorial Basketball Hall of Fame
 Otto D. Unruh, college football coach credited with inventing the "T-Wing" offense
 Mike Wellman, professional football player

Arts
 Tom Adair, songwriter, composer and screenwriter
 Reed Crandall, comic book artist
 Milburn Stone, television actor

Business
Jacob A. Schowalter, Kansas farmer and business owner whose estate formed the basis of the Schowalter Foundation
 Lyle Yost, founder of Hesston Corporation

Health and medicine
 John M. Janzen,  leading figure on issues of health, illness, and healing in Southern and Central Africa

Journalism
 Jeremy Hubbard, television news anchor

Military
 Elizabeth P. Hoisington, United States Army officer, one of the first women to attain the rank of Brigadier General

Politics and law
 Rita Crocker Clements, former First Lady of Texas
 John Mills Houston, member of the United States House of Representatives from 1935 to 1943
 Howard J. McMurray,  United States Representative from Wisconsin
 Kimberly J. Mueller, Judge of the United States District Court for the Eastern District of California
 Errett P. Scrivner, United States Representative from Kansas
 Jesse M. Unruh, "Big Daddy Unruh," Democratic politician
 John C. Yoder, Kansas and West Virginia state judge; West Virginia state senator

See also

 Lists of people from Kansas

References

Harvey County